South Korean boy band Big Bang, formed in 2006 under YG Entertainment, composes of five-members: G-Dragon, Taeyang, T.O.P, Daesung, and Seungri. The group debuted with the single album Big Bang on August 28, 2006, which were followed by two more single albums leading up to their debut Korean studio album, Bigbang Vol.1 (2006). The group's early works were met with moderate success; it was not until their 2007 breakthrough single "Lies" where the group began to gain widespread recognition. At the 2007 Mnet Km Music Festival, BigBang was nominated for five categories, taking home Song of the Year for "Lies" and Best Male Artist. In January 2008, BigBang won all three categories where they were nominated in at the 17th Seoul Music Awards, including the Grand Prize and Best Song for "Lies". A year later, they were awarded Artist of the Year and Best Male Group and at the 2008 Mnet Km Music Festival and Best Album at the 18th Seoul Music Awards. BigBang began expanding their popularity overseas with the release of their Japanese studio albums Number 1 (2008) and Big Bang (2009), winning Best New Artist at the 51st Japan Record Awards.

BigBang returned to South Korea with their fourth EP Tonight (2011), and were presented the award for Best Worldwide Act at the 2011 MTV Europe Music Awards in Belfast. In February 2012, the group released their fifth EP Alive, which spawned the singles "Fantastic Baby", "Blue" and "Bad Boy". That November, BigBang were nominated in six categories at the 2012 Mnet Asian Music Awards, winning three awards including Artist of the Year and Best Male Group. They were also awarded the Guardian Angel award at the same ceremony following the success of their first worldwide concert tour, the Alive Galaxy Tour. At the 2nd Gaon Chart Music Awards, Alive and its singles "Blue" and "Fantastic Baby" won Album of the Year (1st Quarter) and Song of the Year for February and March, respectively.

The group reunited in 2015 with their "Made" series, releasing four single albums—M, A, D, and E—from May to August 2015. The series experienced commercial success, leading the group to become the most nominated and awarded act at the 2015 Mnet Asian Music Awards, winning four out of eight nominations including Artist and Song of the Year. At the annual Melon Music Awards, they were nominated in five categories and similarly won Artist of the Year and Song of the Year for "Bang Bang Bang". The group were additionally awarded with the Song of the Year prize at the 13th Korean Music Awards and 31st Golden Disc Awards in early 2016. At the 5th Gaon Chart Music Awards in February of that year, BigBang won Song of the Month for four consecutive months from May to August with their singles from Made: "Loser", "Bang Bang Bang", "If You", and "Let’s Not Fall In Love".

Awards and nominations

Other accolades

State honors

Listicles

Notes

References

External links
  
  

Awards
Big Bang